Jeffrey Dessner is an American former ice hockey defenseman who was an All-American for Wisconsin.

Career
Dessner was a highly-regarded prospect coming out of high school, being selected in the 7th round of the NHL Draft prior to attending Wisconsin. Unfortunately, a back injury forced Dessner to miss the entire 96–97 season. He did eventually return to the ice as a redshirt freshman (a rarity in college hockey) in 1998, but only played half of the season. In his third year, Dessner finally got back on track and began to demonstrate the talent that had the New York Rangers select him in the draft. He was named as an alternate captain as a senior and performed well on both ends of the ice. Not only did he lead the Badgers' defensemen in scoring, but he was named as the best defender in the WCHA. He helped Wisconsin finish atop the WCHA standings for just the third time in 32 years and produce the program's sixth 30-win season. He was named an All-American for the season and some were expecting him to sign with the Rangers after the year. Dessner, however, still had a year of eligibility remaining and decided to return to Madison for a 4th season. Now team captain, Dessner didn't have quite as outstanding of a campaign in 2001; Wisconsin finished in the middle of the WCHA standings, allowing 20 more goals over the course of the season.

After his college career was over, Dessner's rights were traded to the Atlanta Thrashers for an 8th-round pick. He played one season in their minor league system before heading to Europe and playing two years in Germany. Dessner retired from the game in 2004.

In 2006, Dessner joined Karl Storz SE as a sales associate and worked his way up to regional manager (as of 2021).

Statistics

Regular season and playoffs

Awards and honors

References

External links

1977 births
Living people
AHCA Division I men's ice hockey All-Americans
American men's ice hockey defensemen
Ice hockey people from Illinois
People from Skokie, Illinois
Wisconsin Badgers men's ice hockey players
Chicago Wolves players
Greenville Grrrowl players
Iserlohn Roosters players
Kölner Haie players
New York Rangers draft picks